Frederick Bernard de Neumann (known in Austria and Germany as Bernhard von Neumann; (15 December 1943 – 18 April 2018) was a British mathematician, computer scientist, inventor, and naval historian.

He was educated at the Royal Hospital School and Birmingham University, and was Professor of Mathematics at The City University.

He was a descendant of Johann Andreas von Neumann, nobleman of the Holy Roman Empire, Vienna, 29 March 1797, and of Johann Heinrich von Neumann, nobleman of the Kingdom of Bavaria, Munich, 20 January 1824.

References

John Wonnacott, 2005. Prof Bernard de Neumann – The Mathematician. 2005 Ondaatje Prize-winning portrait of the Royal Society of Portrait Painters.
 Genealogisches Handbuch des in Bayern immatrikulierten Adels, Vol XXII, 1998, p. 681, Degener Verlag.  Neumann family.

External links
Prize for mathematician portrait — BBC News, 26 April 2005.
Prize for Mathematician’s Portrait — London Mathematical Society Newsletter

1943 births
2018 deaths
20th-century British mathematicians
21st-century British mathematicians
British computer scientists
British inventors
British naval historians

Von Neumann family